L